Kanyadanam may refer to:
 Kanyaadaanam, a 1976 Indian Malayalam-language film
 Kanyadanam (1998 film), a Telugu-language drama film
 Kanyadanam (Telugu TV series), a 2021 Indian Telugu-language soap opera
 Kanyadanam (Malayalam TV series), a 2021 Indian Malayalam-language soap opera